Lido is the debut EP from American indie pop band The Colourist.  The album, which was named after The Lido Building (an opaque warehouse on an artificial island in Newport Beach used as a practice space by the band), was released on August 20, 2013 through Republic Records.

Touring 
Following the EP release in late 2013, the Colourist toured North America with New Zealand alternative rock band The Naked and Famous.

Track listing

Charts

Album

Singles

Trivia 
Debut single "Little Games" has been featured on the AT&T Nokia Lumia 1020 commercial.

References

External links 
 

2013 EPs
Pop rock EPs
The Colourist albums